Dimitris Yeros (1948) (Eλληνικά - Δημήτρης Γέρος) is a Greek artist-photographer.

Dimitris Yeros is one of the most influential Greek artists of his generation and one of the first Greek artists to present Performances, Body Art, Video Art and Mail Art.

Exhibitions
He has had 58 individual exhibitions of his works held in Greece and abroad: in Köln, Düsseldorf, New York, Kassel, Strasbourg, Bochum  (The Bochum Museum), Oxford, England (Oxford University), Darmstadt, Indiana (Ball State University Art Gallery), Heidelberg, Nicosia, Mannheim, Milan, Ann Arbor, Michigan (Kelsey Museum of Archaeology), Berlin, Mexico City, Museo de Arte Moderno de Barranquilla-Colombia, Taipei-Taiwan and elsewhere. He has also participated in numerous international group exhibitions, Biennials and Triennials in many parts of the world.

Published works
Many of his graphics have been published by leading art editors. He illustrated books and magazines.  
In 1987, UNICEF chose his work The Dangers of Curiosity to print on cards for international circulation.
The following books with his works have been published: the collection The Sparkling Bathtub (Kastaniotis Ed., 1976);
the photoseries Photopoem (Phyllo, 1977); the art book Yeros with text by Yannis Patilis (Phorkys, 1984); Dimitris Yeros, a book-catalogue of painting works (The Bochum Museum, 1986); D. Yeros, a book of painting works with an essay by Professor Chr. Christou (Prefecture of Viotia, 1998); Theory of the Nude, a book of photographs with an introduction by P.Weiermair (Planodion, 1998); Periorasis, a book of photographs with a foreword by Michel Deon and an introduction by P. Devin (Phyllo, 1999); For a Definition of the Nude, a book of photographs with an introduction by P. Weiermair (Phyllo, 2000); D. Yeros; a book of painting works Eyemazing - The New Collectible Art Photography with an essay by John Wood (Ermoupolia 2001); D. Yeros on C.P. Cavafy's poems, Kelsey Museum, Ann Arbor, Michigan. With an assay by Lauren E. Talalay (2002); D. YEROS, Calendar (Harta Publications, Greece, 2007); Wavelength: D. Yeros and S. Karavouzis with an assay by Athens Schina (Kydoniefs Foundation, Greece, 2008); Dimitris Yeros, Calendar (Harta publications. Greece, 2008); Shades of Love with foreword by Edward Albee and introduction by John Wood (Insight Editions, 2010); Dimitris Yeros, Photographing Gabriel Garcia Marquez, with foreword by Edward Lucie Smith and afterword by Dimitris Yeros, (Kerber Verlag, Germany 2015); Another Narcissus, with a poem by Edward Albee and introduction by John Wood (Phyllo Editions, Greece 2016).

In 2010, Insight Editions-California published the book Shades of Love with photographs, inspired by the poems of Constantine P. Cavafy with a foreword by Edward Albee and introduction by John Wood. The book is honored by American Library Association and featured on their Top Ten list as one of the best books of the year.

Documentaries 
In 2019 he made the documentary Ovil and Usman, lasting 47 minutes. It has been screened at various festivals. 
In 2021 he made the documentary A Lesbos Diary,  lasting 25 minutes.
In 2021 ERT 2 TV, the National Greek Chanel, made a 30-minute documentary about his life and his work.

Works in collections
Numerous works by Dimitris Yeros are to be found in many private collections, national galleries and museums worldwide: Tate Britain, International Center of Photography-New York, National Portrait Gallery-London, The British Museum (London), Museum Bochum (Germany), Musee des beaux-arts de Montreal (Canada), Museo de Arte Moderno Barranquilla, National Gallery-Athens, Greece,  The Cohen Family Collection - New York, Maison Europeenne de La Photographie, Tama Art Museum- Tokyo-Japan, Museum of International Contemporary Graphic Art - Norway, Musee d' Art Contemporain of Chamalieres, New Hampshire Institut of Art- Boston, The Leslie Lohmann Museum - New York,Harry Ransom Center –Austin Texas, Fondazione Benetton-Italy,Benaki Museum Athens-Greece,  and elsewhere.

External links 
 
 Website
 http://www.holdenluntz.com 
 
 
 
 
 
 http://www.peoplegreece.com/article/lesvos-i-kathimerinotita-metanaston-ke-prosfigon-mesa-apo-ton-fako-tou-dimitri-gerou/
 http://www.tovima.gr/culture/article/?aid=510063 
 http://miamiherald.typepad.com/gaysouthflorida/2012/04/10/
 http://www.tovima.gr/culture/article/?aid=365826 
 http://www.fotografia.it/agenda_mostre_dettaglio/218360/2012-05-20-dimitris-yeros---gao-yuan--colors-of-passion.aspx
 http://www.artfixdaily.com/artwire/release/2403-throckmorton-fine-art-presents-colors-of-passion-an-exhibition-pa
 http://photographyfarm.com/2012/05/21/throckmorton-fine-art-presents-colors-of-passion-an-exhibition-pairing-two/
 http://21steditions.wordpress.com/2012/01/09/refuting-history-an-interview-with-john-wood-by-daniel-westover/ 
 http://usa.greekreporter.com/2012/07/11/dimitris-yeros-photo-exhibition-in-throckmorton-fine-art-gallery-ny/
 http://www.nyphotoreview.com/NYPR_REVS/NYPR_REV2385.html   
 http://diastixo.gr/site/index.php?option=com_content&view=article&id=137:dimitris-geros&catid=61:eikastika&Itemid=109 
 http://www.bu.edu/prc/auction2012/pages/119yeros.htm 
 http://lejournaldelaphotographie.com/fullscreen/4032 
 http://www.tlavideo.com/gay-shades-of-love-photographs-inspired-by-the-poe/p-313738-2
 http://www.fotografia.it/agenda_mostre_dettaglio/218360/2012-05-20-dimitris-yeros---gao-yuan--colors-of-passion.aspx
 http://www.artfixdaily.com/artwire/release/2403-throckmorton-fine-art-presents-colors-of-passion-an-exhibition-pa
 http://photographyfarm.com/2012/05/21/throckmorton-fine-art-presents-colors-of-passion-an-exhibition-pairing-two/
 http://21steditions.wordpress.com/2012/01/09/refuting-history-an-interview-with-john-wood-by-daniel-westover/ 
 http://www.newyorker.com/arts/events/art/dimitris-yeros-gao-yuan-throckmorton 
 http://www.bu.edu/prc/auction2012/pages/119yeros.htm 
 http://www.out.com/entertainment/books/2011/11/28/shades-love 
 http://news.kathimerini.gr/4dcgi/_w_articles_civ_2_09/01/2011_427673 
 http://www.athensvoice.gr/the-paper/article/323/%CE%B8%CF%85%CE%BC%CE%AE%CF%83%CE%BF%CF%85-%CF%83%CF%8E%CE%BC%CE%B1%E2%80%A6 
 http://dimitrisangelidis.blogspot.gr/2011/07/blog-post_2065.html 
 http://www.emprosnet.gr/emprosnet-archive/aa075a17-809d-42c4-931a-9a483dc3e3f5
 https://www.elculture.gr/blog/article/ovil-and-usman/
 http://www.quarterly-review.org/?p=1462

Bibliography 
 DIMITRIS YEROS SHADES OF LOVE, By Clayton Maxwell. EYEMAZING MAGAZINE, Spring 2012
 Another Narcissus. OUT magazine. August 2016
 Dimitris Yeros Shades of Love. LE JOURNAL DE LA PHOTOGRAPHIE
 MIAMI HERALD, April 12, 2012.  Photo collection 'Shades of Love' by Dimitris Yeros, intro by Edward Albee.
 Time Out, New York, October 22, 2015. Medium of Desire
 Hyperallergic magazine, February 2, 2016. Medium of Desire, by Zachary Small
 Musee magazine, Dec. 22, 2015. Medium of Desire
 Odyssey magazine. Books: Shades of Love, Photographs Inspired by the Poems of C.P. Cavafy. By Vivienne Nilan. Jan-Feb. 2011
 L’oeil de la Photographie. Edward Albee and Dimitris Yeros Another Narcissus. December 2, 2016
 The Quarterly Review “Harbours hitherto unseen” – the charm of Constantine Cavafy, by Derek Turner. March 25, 2013
 Η ΦΑΝΤΑΣΙΑ ΤΟΥ ΓΕΡΟΥ, ΣΥΝΕΝΤΕΥΞΗ ΣΤΟΝ Χρήστο Νικολόπουλο
 BHMAGAZINO 13 March 2016
 La fortuna de retratar a García Márquez, El Universal, 9-12-2015
 Inauguran exposición con imágenes de Dimitris Yeros, La Jornada 10-12-2015
 EL HERALDO - Dimitris Yeros, el griego que retrató a Gabo, 27-11-2015
 THE OPÉRA, Vol. IV 2015
 New Light on the Magical Realist, by Derek Turner, Quarterly Review, 4-7-2015
 Tribute to “Gabo” by Greek photographer Dimitris Yeros. By Olga Sella,
 Kathimerini 27-5-2015
 Mi amigo Gabo, El Universal, 19-4-2015
 El amigo griego que retrato a Gabo en su intimidad, by Gerardo Martinez. El Universal 17-4-2015
 Gabriel Garcia Marquez by Dimitris Yeros. By Jaqueline Flynn. Musee magazine 12-5-2015
 THE NAKED AND THE NUDE, BY GRAFICHE DELL'ARTIERE
 New Yorker Magazine, by Vince Alleti, 9-7-2012
 Shades of Love. Photographs inspired by the poems of C. P. Cavafy. By Richard Schneider. The gay and lesbian review worldwide, Sep-Oct. 2011
 Shades of Love. Photographs inspired by the poems of C. P. Cavafy. By Jain
 Kelly. Focus magazine, spring 2012
 Shades of Love. Photographs inspired by the poems of C. P. Cavafy. By Ara H. Merjian. Afterimage magazine, 1-1-2012
 Shades of Love. By Raef Harrison, OUT magazine, 28-11-2011
 Dimitris Yeros, by Cristina Franzoni. Zoom magazine, July 2011
 Vernissage magazine, Septembre 2008
 Art World, Oct-Nov. 2007
 Blue magazine, Jan. 2004
 Naked Truth - Proto Thema, 14-8-2015
 Photoshooting Marquez, by Helen Bistica, kathimerini, 7-6-2015
 The Greek who photographed Marquez, by Olga Sella, Kathimerini 16-5-2015
 The Greek friend of G. G. Marquez. By Marinos Vithoulkas. People Magazine - Proto Thema 26-4-2015
 Famous people of Mexico: Photonet magazine January 2012 issue
 Deco-Tachydromos, Fall 2007
 Maison and Decoration, Greek edition, issue No 76
 Eleftheros Typos, by Eugenia Kaltezioti, 17-8-2008
 David Leddick,Male Nude Now, New Visions for the 21st Century, Universe Ed,2001, page 70.
 Evangelos Andreou, D. Yeros-The "myth" of a synthetic extravagant. “Katoikia” Magazine, is. 16 – Athens 1984
 Edward Lucie-Smith, Gods Becoming Men, Fryssiras Museum, 2004, pages 15,76-79,96.
 21st The Journal of Contemporary Photography, Volume VI, Flesh & Spirit,2004, pages 203- 207.
 Edward Lucie Smith, Erotica.The Fine Art of Sex, Ivy Press Ltd 1997, reprinted Moscow 2004, page 27.
 James Spada, The Romantic Male Nude, Abrams, New York, 2007, plates 56, 75, 130, 156, page 159.
 “OK” magazine, ΔΗΜΗΤΡΗΣ ΓΕΡΟΣ 17-7-2021
 Revista Noche Labertino, 5th edition, 2018
 ARA H. MERJIAN  “Classicism Subverted” Paris April-May 2005
 Eleftheros Typos, 24-5-20
 Athena Schina : Man is the dream of a shadow, 2017
 “Harbours hitherto unseen” –  the charm of Constantine Cavafy March 25, 2013 by Derek Turner
 Ζέτα Τζιώτη. Εφημερίδα ΑΞΙΑ, Σάββατο 15 Μαρτίου 2020. Δημήτρης Γέρος: «Τρέχω να προλάβω να τα ζωγραφίσω όλα»
 Γιάννης Κοντός: Ο Καβάφης και τα σώματα. 2015
 Σάββας Χριστοδουλίδης, ΙΣΤΟΡΙΕΣ ΕΝΟΣ ΝΗΝΕΜΟΥ ΚΑΙΡΟΥ. Κύπρος 17-11-2014
 Derek Turner , New lights on the magical realist, quarterly review, 2016
 Dominique Nahas , Happenstance and Reverie in the Works  Dimitris Yeros, 2020
 Edmund White, The Big Solitary Man, May 2011
 Michel Déon: Artist Dimitris Yeros
 NEON magazine:  Dimitris Yeros, Shades of Love…in the Time of Cholera,  June 2016
 Πλάτων Ριβέλης: Η αλήθεια τού φωτογραφικού γυμνού (D. Yeros, Θεωρία Γυμνού, Πλανόδιον) Ta Nea 1999
 Vicki Goldberg: The Persistence of History, The Insistence of Time. Assay for the catalogue of the exhibition A Lesbos Diary, Throckmorton gallery. New York
 Quentin Crisp: on the book Theory of The Nude . New York 2000
 Yannis Kontos: THE DARK WAFT OF AIR AND THE FREEDOM OF THE SKY  IN THE PAINTINGS OF DIMITRIS YEROS, 2015
 DIMITRIS YEROS, Sense  and  Sensibility, by Lauren E. Talalay
 Acting Director and Associate Curator, Kelsey Museum University of Michigan.
 Peter Weiermair: About man and animal, On the new works of Dimitris Yeros
 Quentin Crisp, on the book Theory of The Nude 
 One of us, by Richard Howard, May 2011
 Dimitris Yeros-Gao Yuan: Colors of Passion.The New York Photo Review, By R. Wayne Parsons, July 4-17, 2012
 The Exuberant Flowering of Dimitris Yeros, by John Wood
 Paul LaRosa: Chiseled Tableaus: The Nudes of Dimitris Yeros
 Dimitris Yeros – PERIORASIS, by Pierre Devin. Fιvrier 1999

Awards 

The book 'Shades of Love' is honored by American Library Association and featured on their Top Ten list as one of the best books of the year.

References 

Greek photographers
Greek painters
Living people
1948 births